Rah-e Danesh Synagogue is a synagogue located near Yusefabad street in Tehran, Iran.

History 
In the decade of the 1340s SH (1961–1971 AD) the number of Jews in the Yusefabad neighborhood increased dramatically. Thus a group of Jews decided to create the Synagogue in the Yusefabad street in twentieth alley. The synagogue experienced major reconstruction in 1388 SH (2009–2010 AD).

References 

Synagogues in Tehran